General elections were held in Grenada on 8 July 2008. Out of a total of fifteen seats, the opposition National Democratic Congress (NDC) won eleven seats and the governing New National Party (NNP) won four, bringing the NDC to power for the first time since 1995. The NNP was looking for a fourth consecutive term in power, which would have been a first in Grenadian history.

Campaign
In its election manifesto, which it debuted on June 25, 2008, the NNP promised the creation of 4,000 jobs, along with 4% growth in the economy.

Opinion polls
A poll conducted by the Caribbean Development Research Services from June 6 to June 9 showed the NNP with 36.4% support, the NDC with 32.3% support, the Grenada United Labour Party (GULP) with 1.1% support, and the People's Labour Movement (PLM) with 0.8% support. The two later formed an electoral alliance, the Labour Platform.

Results
In one notable outcome of the election, Deputy Prime Minister Gregory Bowen of the NNP was defeated in his constituency of St. George South East by Pastor Karl Hood of the NDC. Mitchell was re-elected from the constituency of St. George North West. Complete results are as follows:

Elected members

Reactions
The Organization of American States (OAS) observed the elections, and it described "the electoral process in Grenada during the General Elections as extremely positive, with relatively few areas that could be improved." All of the polling sites were observed, and voters were calm and well-behaved.

A political party in nearby Dominica, the People's Democratic Movement, attributed the victory to Mitchell's "arrogance, intolerance to criticism and lack of consultation with the people" during his time in office.

Aftermath
NDC leader Tillman Thomas succeeded the NNP's Keith Mitchell as Prime Minister of Grenada on July 9. He was sworn in at the Grenada Trade Centre in Grand Anse, St. George's by Governor-General Daniel Williams. On this occasion, Thomas promised "openness and transparency" and said that he would practice "the politics of inclusion". For his part, Mitchell said that the people voted for change and congratulated Thomas. Thomas's cabinet, composed of 17 members, was sworn in at the National Stadium on July 13. In addition to being Prime Minister, Thomas took the portfolios of Legal Affairs, National Security, Information, and Public Administration. Two members of non-governmental organizations who were not affiliated with the NDC were included in the cabinet: Franca Bernadine as Minister of Education and Human Resources, and Jimmy Bristol as Attorney-General.

References

Elections in Grenada
Grenada
2008 in Grenada
July 2008 events in North America